Kumara Raja is a 1961 Indian Tamil-language film directed by G. K. Ramu. The film stars J. P. Chandrababu, T. S. Balaiah and M. N. Rajam. It was released on 21 April 1961.

Plot 
A wealthy man (T. S. Balaiah) has a son (J. P. Chandrababu) who spends his money and time singing and dancing with girls. The father tries to marry him to a modest girl (M. N. Rajam). But the son spends most of his time with his girl friend (Suryakala). How the son is brought back to normal life forms the rest of the story.

Cast 
The list was adapted from Thiraikalanjiyam — Part 2

Production 
J. P. Chandrababu, who was playing mostly comedian roles was cast in the main role. At a time when bigger stars like M. G. Ramachandran and Sivaji Ganesan were paid salaries ranging from —, Chandrababu received  for this film. The film was in production as early as 1960.

Soundtrack 
Music was composed by T. R. Pappa while the lyrics were penned by Pattukkottai Kalyanasundaram, A. Maruthakasi, Thanjai N. Ramaiah Dass and K. D. Santhanam.

Reception 
Kanthan of Kalki wrote that when the producers themselves did not care about the script, why should the viewer care about it.

References

External links 
 

1960s Tamil-language films
1961 films
Films scored by T. R. Pappa